Athanasios Ghavelas (born 19 December 1999) is a Greek Paralympic athlete who specializes in the 100 metres dash. He represented Greece at the Paralympic Games, along with his guide Sotiris Garaganis.

Career
Ghavelas represented Greece at the 2020 Summer Paralympics in the 100 metres T11 event and won the gold medal with a world record time of 10.82.

References

1999 births
Living people
Paralympic athletes of Greece
Medalists at the World Para Athletics European Championships
Athletes (track and field) at the 2020 Summer Paralympics
Medalists at the 2020 Summer Paralympics
Paralympic medalists in athletics (track and field)
Paralympic gold medalists for Greece
Greek male sprinters
21st-century Greek people